Sarmienta scandens, the Chilean pitcher flower, is a species of flowering plant, and the sole member of its genus within the family Gesneriaceae. It is native to the cool South Chilean rainforest, where it grows as an epiphyte.

The Latin specific epithet scandens means “climbing”.

Description

Cultivation
In temperate regions it is usually grown under glass, either epiphytically or using a specialist potting medium containing leaf mould or sphagnum moss. It may be placed outside during the summer months, in a warm sheltered spot where the temperature does not fall below .

The plant is still widely advertised as Sarmienta repens, a name which is now regarded as illegitimate.

Sarmienta scandens has gained the Royal Horticultural Society’s Award of Garden Merit.

References

Gesnerioideae
Monotypic Lamiales genera
Flora of Chile
Gesneriaceae genera